The following is an incomplete list of festivals in Europe, with links to separate lists by country and region where applicable. This list includes festivals of diverse types, including regional festivals, religious festivals, commerce festivals, film festivals, folk festivals, carnivals, recurring festivals on holidays, and music festivals. Some recurring European traditional festivals are over a thousand years old. Music festivals are annotated "(music)" for countries where there is not a dedicated music section.

The list overlaps with List of film festivals in Europe.

Sovereign states

Albania 
 
Nowruz 
Summer Festival, Albania 
Gjirokastër National Folklore Festival
International Film Summerfest of Durrës (film)

Music festivals in Albania

Festivali i Këngës 
Netet e Klipit Shqiptar
Top Fest
Kënga Magjike

Andorra 

Public holidays in Andorra

Austria

Belarus 
 
Listapad (film)
Slavianski Bazaar in Vitebsk
Global Gathering (music)
Ultra Europe (music)
Unsound Festival (music)

Belgium

Bosnia and Herzegovina

Bulgaria 

International Chamber Music Festival Plovdiv 
Black Box International Festival 
Name days in Bulgaria 
National Children's Book Festival 
Sofia Pride
Sofia International Film Festival (film)
In the Palace International Short Film Festival (film)

Music festivals in Bulgaria

European Grand Prix for Choral Singing
Bultek
Rozhen National Folklore Fair
Slaveevi Noshti
Loop Live
Spirit of Burgas
March Music Days
Kavarna Rock Fest
Golden Orpheus
Wrong Fest

Croatia

Cyprus 

Kypria festival
The AfroBanana Republic Festival (arts & music)
Reggae Sunjam Festival
Pafos Aphrodite Festival Cyprus
Wine Festival of Cyprus
International Festival of Ancient Greek Drama, Cyprus (theater)
Pafos Aphrodite Festival Cyprus (theater)

The Czech Republic

Music festivals in the Czech Republic
Metronome Festival Prague (arts & music)
United Islands of Prague (arts & music)

Denmark
Roskilde Festival
SmukFest (Skanderborg Festival)

Copenhagen Distortion
Copenhell

List of festivals in Denmark

Estonia 

Baltic song festivals (music)
Tallinn Black Nights Film Festival (film)

Music festivals in Estonia
 
List of music festivals in Estonia

Finland 

List of festivals in Finland

France 

Fête des lumières, Lyon
Nuits de Fourvière, Lyon
Nuits Sonores, Lyon

Germany

List of festivals in Germany

Greece

Hungary

Iceland

Ireland 
 

List of festivals in the United Kingdom

Italy

Latvia 

Go Blonde Festival 
Riga Salsa Festival 
Studentu paradīze
18 November Torchlight procession
Baltic Pride
Riga International Film Festival 2ANNAS  (film)
Lielais Kristaps (film)

Music festivals in Latvia

Baltic song festivals 
Latvian Song and Dance Festival
Positivus Festival
Saulkrasti Jazz Festival
Orient, the Festival of Eastern Music
Europeade

Liechtenstein 

Public holidays in Liechtenstein

Lithuania 

 Baltic song festivals
 Kaunas International Film Festival
 Kaziuko mugė
 Klaipėda Sea Festival
 Mados infekcija
 Užgavėnės
 Vilnius Book Fair
 Vilnius International Film Festival
 Yaga Gathering

Luxembourg 
 
Buergbrennen 
Dancing procession of Echternach 
Emaischen 
Octave celebration 
Schueberfouer

Music festivals in Luxembourg

Open Air Field
Echternach Music Festival
Rock um Knuedler

Malta 

Maltese Carnival 
Nadur Carnival

Music festivals in Malta

Festival Kanzunetta Indipendenza
Malta Song Festival
Isle of MTV
L-Għanja tal-Poplu
Malta Jazz Festival
Malta Music Awards
Malta Song for Europe
Valletta International Baroque Festival

Moldova 
Public holidays in Moldova

Monaco 

Golden Nymph Award 
Monte-Carlo Television Festival 
The Spring Arts Festival
Monaco International Film Festival (film)
Monaco Music Film Festival (film) 
International Circus Festival of Monte-Carlo (theater)
Mondial du Théâtre (theater)

Montenegro 

Merlinka festival
MontenegroSong (music)
Operosa (music)
Pjesma Mediterana (music)
Refresh Festival (music)
Sea Dance Festival (music)
Southern Soul Festival (music)
Sunčane Skale (music)

The Netherlands 

 Amsterdam Dance Event (music)
 Awakenings (music)
 Lowlands (music)
 Mysteryland (music)
 Pinkpop (music)
 Welcome to the Future (music)

North Macedonia

Norway

Poland

Portugal

List of festivals in Portugal

Romania

List of festivals in Romania

Russia

San Marino 
Public holidays in San Marino

Serbia

Slovakia 
 
Public holidays in Slovakia
Name days in Slovakia

Music festivals in Slovakia
 
Bratislava Chamber Guitar
Bratislava Music Festival
GrapeFestival
Košice Music Spring Festival
Bratislava New Generation-Day FM Festival
Pohoda (music festival)
Transmission (festival)
Breathe Festival

Slovenia 
 
List of festivals in Slovenia

Spain 
 
El Ajo Festival

Sweden

Switzerland 

List of festivals in Switzerland

Ukraine

United Kingdom

List of festivals in the United Kingdom
List of music festivals in the United Kingdom
List of food festivals in the United Kingdom
List of festivals in the United Kingdom by region
List of festivals in the Isle of Man

States with limited recognition

Kosovo 

 
Lists by region
Events and festivals in Gjakova  (city)
Events and festivals in Pristina  (city)
Film festivals in Pristina
Events and festivals in Peć  (city)

Festivals in Kosovo 
Flaka e Janarit 
Nowruz
40BunarFest 
Anibar International Animation Festival (film)
DAM Festival Pristina (music)
Chopin Piano Fest Pristina (music)
NGOM Fest (music)

Northern Cyprus 
Public holidays in Northern Cyprus

Transnistria 
Public holidays in Transnistria

Dependencies and other territories

Åland 
Public holidays in Åland

The Faroe Islands 
 
Ólavsøka 
Stevna 
G! Festival (music)
Summarfestivalurin (music)

Gibraltar 

GIB Fringe
Gibraltar Chess Festival
Gibraltar Music Festival (music)
Gibraltar World Music Festival (music)

Guernsey 

Guernsey Festival of Performing Arts (music)

Jersey 
 
Jersey Eisteddfod 
Jersey Folklore Festival 
Jersey Live (music)
Branchage (film)

Isle of Man 

List of festivals in the Isle of Man

Svalbard 
Culture of Svalbard

See also

List of festivals
List of film festivals
List of music festivals

References

External links

 

Region topic template using suffix
 
₵Europe